The Association of Municipalities for Independence is a Catalan organization of town councils and other administration entities created with the goal of achieving the independence of Catalonia.

This entity was formed on 28 December 2011, in the city of Vic. Nowadays it has the support of 947 town councils out of the 948 total in Catalonia (99%). Recently they have also received international recognition when in late 2019 the council of Torrelodones expressed its support to their cause. In addition, 39 out of 39 county councils give support to the association and also all the four Catalan provincial councils. 

There are seven major parties in Catalonia that support the right of self-determination. In 2012, these were the proportions of mayors of each party who have signed for the association:
 CUP: 4/4 (100%)
 ERC: 128/139 (92.1%)
 Convergència and Unió: 402/519 (75.3%)
 ICV-EUiA: 13/23 (56.5%)
 PSC 76/196: (38.8%)
 PP: 0/8 (0%). (It does not support either self-determination or independence)
 Without party (independent candidates) 46/53 (86.8%)
 Other parties 4/4 (100%)
 Administrated by public committee 0/1 (0%)
 Partit Junts per la Independencia (12/27%)
 Partit Més Junts que Els Anteriors (MJQEN) (3/9%)

Objectives

As stated in the foundation articles of the association, these are the goals and purposes of the organization: 

1. Becoming a broad discussion space to share ideas, initiatives (institutional and citizen-level), experiences, information, management tools and everything that can be useful to bring the people of Catalonia to independence in order to achieve full functioning municipal powers.
2. Promote and defend Catalan national rights.
3. Develop the citizen need for Catalonia to exercise her right to self-determination. 
4. Create a promotion network abroad, mainly within the framework of the European Union. 
5. Promote town council self-finance.
6. Establish synergies in other areas, such as business and finance.

Statistics

As of 10 October 2013, 71.3% of the total territory supported the AMI.

See also
Municipalities of Catalonia - lists AMI member municipalities
Comarques of Catalonia - lists AMI member comarcas
Catalan independence
Free Catalan Territory

References

External links
 Official web of Association of Municipalities for Independence (in catalan)

Catalan independence movement